A torture museum is a museum that exhibits instruments of torture and provides tutorials on the history of torture and its use in human society. Several museums dedicated to the history of torture are located in Europe.

Torture museums

Europe
Examples of the torture museums in Europe include:
 Torture Exhibition near Castelul Corvinilor in Hunedoara, Romania
 Museo della Tortura di Siena in Siena, Italy
 the Torture Museum, Amsterdam, Netherlands; 
 Torture Museum in San Marino;
 Museum of Medieval Torture Instruments,  Amsterdam, Netherlands;
 the Torture Museum Oude Steen in Bruges, Belgium; 
 the Mediaeval Torture Museum (Mittelalterliches Foltermuseum) in Rüdesheim am Rhein, Germany; 
 the Medieval Crime Museum (das Kriminalmuseum) in Rothenburg ob der Tauber, Germany; 
 the Medieval Criminal and Torture Museum (Museo della Tortura e di Criminologia Medievale) in San Gimignano, Italy;
 the Museum of Medieval Torture Instruments in Prague, Czech Republic;
 the Torture Museum in Santillana del Mar, Spain;
 the Torture Museum (Foltermuseum auf Burg Sommereck) in Spittal an der Drau, Austria;
Medieval Torture Museum in El Castell de Guadalest, Spain
 and the Tortureum - Museum of Torture in Zagreb, Croatia

The Museum of Medieval Torture Instruments was opened in 2012 in Amsterdam, Netherlands. It uses human size wax figures to increase the interactive learning of what the Dark Ages considered to be torture.

Asia
Examples of the torture museums in Asia include:
 Tuol Sleng Genocide Museum in Phnom Penh, Cambodia.

North America
The largest interactive torture museum in the United States:
 The Medieval Torture Museum in the cities of Saint Augustine (FL) and Chicago (IL).

See also
 Medieval instruments of torture
 Torture chamber

References

External links
 Torture Museum in Amsterdam, Netherlands
 Torture Museum Oude Steen in Bruges, Belgium
 Medieval Criminal and Torture Museum (Museo della Tortura e di Criminologia Medievale) in San Gimignano, Italy
 Museo Criminale Mediovale
 Medieval Crime Museum in Rothenburg ob der Tauber, Germany

Torture
Types of museums
Torture